Nguyễn Hoàng (28 August 1525 – 20 July 1613) was the first of the Nguyễn lords who ruled the southern provinces of Vietnam between 1558 and 1613, from a series of cities: Ai Tu (1558–70), Tra Bat (1570–1600), and Dinh Cat (modern-day Huế) (1600–13).

Early life
He was the second son of Nguyễn Kim. When his father was assassinated by a Mạc supporter, his brother-in-law Trịnh Kiểm took command of the Lê royalist army. Sometime after his older brother (Nguyễn Uông) died (believed to have been poisoned), Nguyễn Hoàng requested his brother in law, and was appointed to govern the southernmost province of Vietnam. This land was formerly Champa territory which had been conquered by emperor Lê Thánh Tông and at the time was under control of Mạc force. Nguyễn Hoàng defeated the enemy commander Duke Lập and took over the province in 1558. In 1573 he was given the title Grand Master (Thái phó) by Emperor Lê Thế Tông. Later he was given the title Duke of Môn (Môn Công).

Rule
In 1592, when Trịnh Tùng laid siege to the Eastern Capital (modern-day Hanoi), Nguyễn Hoàng lend him resources and troops. The Nguyen army joined the Royal (Trịnh) army and helped destroy the remainder of the Mạc army. For reasons that are mysterious, when the new Emperor, Lê Kinh Tông, ascended the throne, Nguyễn Hoàng refused to recognize the new sovereign and instead took for himself the new title of Good Prince (Huu Vuong) in 1600. Perhaps an explanation is found in that his nephew Trịnh Tùng had been given a similar title just one year earlier: Pacifying Prince (Bình An Vương). Nguyễn Hoàng had many children (10 sons) but most of them either lost their lives in the battlefields or stayed in the North. His 6th son Nguyễn Phúc Nguyên succeeded him upon his death in 1613. He ruled the south for 55 years. 

The reason Trịnh Kiểm appointed Nguyễn Hoàng to the Southern provinces is not clear. As anecdote goes, Trinh Kiểm, being afraid of losing power to Nguyễn brothers, ordered the assassination of Nguyễn Hoàng's older brother. As for Hoang, Trịnh Kiểm wanted to take advantage of Mạc's southern garrison troops to eliminate his brother in law.

Legacy
Nguyễn Hoàng is considered as the founder of the Nguyen dynasty (1802-1945) and Southern Vietnam. In 2013, his 400th anniversary was celebrated in Hue.

See also 
 Lê dynasty
 List of Vietnamese dynasties

References

Sources 
 Encyclopedia of Asian History, Volume 3 (Nguyen Lords) 1988. Charles Scribner's Sons, New York. 
 [Genealogy of the Royal Nguyen Family] 
 Annam and its Minor Currency Chapter 16 (downloaded May 2006)

|-

Hoang
1525 births
1613 deaths
Hoang
Founding monarchs